Sabado Nights is a 1995 Philippine comedy drama film directed by Romy Suzara. The film stars Ina Raymundo, Michelle Parton and Pia Pilapil. It is based on the 1995 television commercial of San Miguel Beer.

Plot
The film revolves around the lives of Rina (Ina), a liberated girl who engages in a relationship of three men at the same time; Mindy (Pia), a photojournalist who is involved with a lesbian; and Shiela (Michelle), a family breadwinner who runs away with a taxi driver.

Cast
 Ina Raymundo as Rina
 Michelle Parton as Shiela
 Pia Pilapil as Mindy
 Matthew Mendoza as Marty
 Anthony Cortez as Edgar
 Lander Vera-Perez as Renzo
 Paolo Abrera as Mok Mok
 Jessica Rodriguez as Jessica
 Dexter Doria as Shiela's Mom
 Shintaro Valdez as Jan
 Bobby Andrews as Jerome
 Gino Ilustre as Anton

References

External links

1995 films
1995 comedy-drama films
Filipino-language films
Philippine comedy-drama films
Neo Films films
Films directed by Romy Suzara